Le Rozel is a commune in the Manche department in Normandy in north-western France.

Its INSEE number is 50442, and its postal code is 50340.

Prehistory
Neanderthals are thought to have been in the area, around 80,000 years ago, with evidence provided by 257 footprints fossilised in sandy mud alongside other archaeological material, excavated between 2012 and 2017. Most of the footprints were small and clearly made by children (10-14 people). The discovery at Le Rozel is the largest of rare fossil footprints of the hominin.

See also
Communes of the Manche department

References

Rozel